Thomas Desmond Coughlan  (30 April 1934 – 9 November 2017) was a New Zealand rugby union player. A flanker, Coughlan represented South Canterbury and, briefly,  at a provincial level. He played just one match for the New Zealand national side, the All Blacks: a test against the touring Australian team in 1958. He later was a  selector in 1973 and 1974.

Born in Mosgiel, Coughlan came from a farming background. He was educated at St Kevin's College in Oamaru. He died in Christchurch on 9 November 2017.

References

1934 births
2017 deaths
People from Mosgiel
People educated at St Kevin's College, Oamaru
New Zealand rugby union players
New Zealand international rugby union players
South Canterbury rugby union players
King Country rugby union players
Rugby union flankers
Rugby union players from Otago